Cyril Joseph Trimnell-Ritchard (1 December 1898 – 18 December 1977), known professionally as Cyril Ritchard, was an Australian stage, screen and television actor, and director. He is best remembered today for his performance as Captain Hook in the Mary Martin musical production of Peter Pan. In 1945, he played Gabriele Eisenstein in Gay Rosalinda at the Palace theatre in London, a version of Strauss's Die Fledermaus by Erich Wolfgang Korngold in which he appeared with Peter Graves. The show was conducted by Richard Tauber and ran for almost a year.

Life and career
Ritchard was born in the Sydney suburb of Surry Hills, one of five siblings born to Sydney-born parents: Herbert Trimnell-Ritchard, a Protestant grocer, and Margaret, sometimes called "Marguerite" ( Collins), a Roman Catholic, in whose faith the children were raised. Educated by the Jesuits at St Aloysius' College, Cyril studied medicine at University of Sydney until he abandoned his career in medicine in 1917 and decided to become an actor.

Dance teacher Minnie Hooper suggested Ritchard team up with one of her dancers, Madge Elliott, but Madge rejected him because he couldn't dance. Two years later, after a practice waltz, Madge and Cyril realized they were a team, and they went on a dancing tour of New Zealand.

Madge and Cyril appeared in Yes, Uncle! and Going Up, both in 1918. They then went their separate ways. Ritchard shared an apartment with Walter Pidgeon in New York while he appeared there, and Madge made her first West End appearance in 1925. Ritchard joined her in London and they reestablished the dancing partnership. In 1927 Laddie Cliff booked them to star in Lady Luck at the Carlton Theatre in 1927.

In 1932 they returned to Australia where they were a hit. They appeared in a number of musicals, including Blue Roses. Their swan song performance in Australia was their wedding  ceremony at St Mary's Cathedral, Sydney, in September 1935. There were said to be 5,000 onlookers at the wedding;  Madge's four-yard £400 veil had a starring role.

Peter Pan
Ritchard achieved star status in 1954 as Captain Hook in the Broadway production of Peter Pan starring Mary Martin, who shared the same birthday as Ritchard (1 December). For his work in the show, he received a Tony Award as Best Featured Actor in a Musical. 

Both Ritchard and Martin starred in the NBC television productions of the musical, beginning with a live color telecast in 1955. The television version was well-received, and Ritchard reprised his role in 1956 and 1960.

Additional Roles

In 1958, he starred in the Cole Porter CBS television musical Aladdin. In 1959, he was nominated for a second Tony Award, for Best Actor in a Play, for “The Pleasure of His Company.”

He appeared onstage in The Roar of the Greasepaint – The Smell of the Crowd (1965), with Anthony Newley, and Sugar (1972). He was also a Broadway director: The Happiest Girl in the World (1961) (in which he also appeared), Roar Like a Dove (1964) and The Irregular Verb to Love (1963) (in which he also appeared).

His film appearances include the role of the villain in Alfred Hitchcock's early talkie Blackmail (1929) and much later in the Tommy Steele vehicle Half a Sixpence (1967).

Ritchard also appeared regularly on a variety of television programs in the late 1950s and 1960s. For example, he appeared as a mystery guest on What's My Line? on the 22 December 1957 episode of the popular Sunday night CBS-TV program. In the 1950s Ritchard played the comic lead in Jacques Offenbach's operetta La Perichole at the Metropolitan Opera in New York City. Later Ritchard served as a guest panelist on the Met's radio quiz show, where he was referred to as Sir Cyril, although he was never knighted. His wife, Madge Elliott, died of cancer in 1955 in New York.

Death
Shortly before he died, Ritchard performed as the voice of Elrond in the Rankin/Bass television production of The Hobbit. Ritchard lived at The Langham, an apartment house in New York.

He suffered a heart attack on 25 November 1977, while appearing as the narrator in the Chicago touring company of Side by Side by Sondheim. He died on 18 December 1977 in Chicago, aged 79. He was buried beside his wife at Saint Mary's Cemetery in Ridgefield, Connecticut, near his rural home. His funeral mass was celebrated by Archbishop Fulton Sheen. He and Madge had a baby boy who died in infancy in 1939.

Filmography
 Piccadilly (1929) as Victor Smiles
 Blackmail (1929, directed by Alfred Hitchcock) as The Artist
 Just for a Song (1930) as Craddock
 Symphony in Two Flats (1930) as Leo Chavasse
 Service for Ladies (1932) as Sir William Carter (uncredited)
 Danny Boy (1934) as John Martin
 The Show Goes On (1937) as Jimmy
 It's a Grand Old World (1937) as Brain
 I See Ice (1938) as Paul Martine
 Dangerous Medicine (1938) as Dr. Noel Penwood
 The Winslow Boy (1948) as Cyril Ritchard
 Woman Hater (1948) as Reveller (uncredited)
 The Daydreamer (1966) as The Sandman (voice)
 Half a Sixpence (1967) as Harry Chitterlow
 Hans Brinker (1969, TV movie) as Mijnheer Kleef
 The Enchanted World of Danny Kaye: The Emperor's New Clothes (1972, TV movie) as Emperor Klockenlocher (voice)
 Tubby the Tuba (1975) as The Frog (voice)
 Captain Kangaroo 1975 as a World Traveler
 The First Christmas: The Story of the First Christmas Snow (1975, TV short) as Father Thomas (voice)
 The Hobbit (1977, TV movie) as Elrond (voice, final film role)

Radio appearances

References

External links

 
 
 Biography of Ritchard

1898 births
1977 deaths
Australian male film actors
Australian male musical theatre actors
Australian male stage actors
Australian male television actors
Australian Roman Catholics
Donaldson Award winners
Male actors from Sydney
Tony Award winners
People educated at St Aloysius' College (Sydney)
University of Sydney alumni
20th-century Australian male actors
Australian expatriate male actors in the United States
20th-century Australian male singers